A bibliographic database is a database of bibliographic records, an organized digital collection of references to published literature, including journal and newspaper articles, conference proceedings, reports, government and legal publications, patents, books, etc.  In contrast to library catalogue entries, a large proportion of the bibliographic records in bibliographic databases describe articles, conference papers, etc., rather than complete monographs, and they generally contain very rich subject descriptions in the form of keywords, subject classification terms, or abstracts.

A bibliographic database may be general in scope or cover a specific academic discipline like computer science. A significant number of bibliographic databases are proprietary, available by licensing agreement from vendors, or directly from the indexing and abstracting services that create them.

Many bibliographic databases have evolved into digital libraries, providing the full text of the indexed contents: for instance CORE also mirrors and indexes the full text of scholarly articles and Our Research develops a search engine for open access content found by Unpaywall. Others converge with non-bibliographic scholarly databases to create more complete disciplinary search engine systems, such as Chemical Abstracts or Entrez.

History
Prior to the mid-20th century, individuals searching for published literature had to rely on printed bibliographic indexes, generated manually from index cards.  "During the early 1960s computers were used to digitize text for the first time; the purpose was to reduce the cost and time required to publish two American abstracting journals, the Index Medicus of the National Library of Medicine and the Scientific and Technical Aerospace Reports of the National Aeronautics and Space Administration (NASA). By the late 1960s such bodies of digitized alphanumeric information, known as bibliographic and numeric databases, constituted a new type of information resource. Online interactive retrieval became commercially viable in the early 1970s over private telecommunications networks.  The first services offered a few databases of indexes and abstracts of scholarly literature.  These databases contained bibliographic descriptions of journal articles that were searchable by keywords in author and title, and sometimes by journal name or subject heading.  The user interfaces were crude, the access was expensive, and searching was done by librarians on behalf of 'end users'.

See also
 Citation index
 Document-oriented database
 Full-text database
 List of academic databases and search engines
 Institutional repository
 Online public access catalog (OPAC; library catalog)

References

Information science
 
Library 2.0